Elijah Barrett Prettyman (August 23, 1891 – August 4, 1971) was a United States circuit judge of the United States Court of Appeals for the District of Columbia Circuit. His son was American attorney E. Barrett Prettyman Jr.

Education and career

Born on August 23, 1891, in Lexington, Virginia, Prettyman received a Bachelor of Arts degree in 1910 from Randolph–Macon College and an Artium Magister degree in 1911 from the same institution. He received a Bachelor of Laws in 1915 from Georgetown Law. He entered private practice in Hopewell, Virginia from 1915 to 1917.

Prettyman was a United States Army Captain during World War I from 1917 to 1919. Although he was commissioned as an artillery captain, he also served as a judge advocate where he oversaw hundreds of courts-martial.  He was a special attorney for the Bureau of Internal Revenue of the United States Department of the Treasury in Washington, D.C. and New York City, New York from 1919 to 1920. He was in private practice in Chicago, Illinois, Washington, D.C., and New York City from 1920 to 1933.

Prettyman was general counsel for the Bureau of Internal Revenue from 1933 to 1934. He was corporation counsel for Washington, D.C. from 1934 to 1936. He was in private practice in Washington, D.C. and Hartford, Connecticut from 1936 to 1945.

Federal judicial service

Prettyman was nominated by President Harry S. Truman on September 12, 1945, to an Associate Justice seat on the United States Court of Appeals for the District of Columbia (United States Circuit Judge of the United States Court of Appeals for the District of Columbia Circuit from June 25, 1948) vacated by Judge Justin Miller. He was confirmed by the United States Senate on September 24, 1945, and received his commission on September 28, 1945. He served as Chief Judge from 1958 to 1960. He was a member of the Judicial Conference of the United States from 1959 to 1960. He assumed senior status on April 16, 1962. His service terminated on August 4, 1971, due to his death. He was buried at Rockville Cemetery in Rockville, Maryland.

Honors

In March 1997, the E. Barrett Prettyman Federal Courthouse was named in his honor.

References

Sources
 
 A Tribute to a Champion of the Law: U.S. Courthouse Named After Longtime Appellate Judge (The Washington Post, March 27, 1997) at Prettyman family site

External links
 

1891 births
1971 deaths
United States Army personnel of World War I
Georgetown University Law Center alumni
Georgetown University Law Center faculty
Judges of the United States Court of Appeals for the D.C. Circuit
People from Lexington, Virginia
People from the Greater Richmond Region
Military personnel from Virginia
Randolph–Macon College alumni
United States Army officers
United States court of appeals judges appointed by Harry S. Truman
20th-century American judges
Virginia lawyers
Lawyers from Washington, D.C.
Burials in Maryland